Events in the year 1932 in India.

Incumbents
 Emperor of India – George V
 Viceroy of India – The Earl of Willingdon

Events
 National income - 20,286 million
 Third civil disobedience campaign.
 3 January – British arrest and intern Mohandas Gandhi and Vallabhbhai Patel.
 February – Terrorism in Bengal.
 16 May – Massive riots between Hindus and Muslims in Bombay – thousands dead and injured.
 25–28 June - Indian Cricket Team play their first ever Test match.
 17 August – Government award as to representation published.
 August – India wins Hockey Gold Medal at Los Angeles Olympics 
 20 September – Mohandas Gandhi begins a hunger strike in Poona prison.
 24 September – Gandhi approves a compromise.
 1 October - Port Haj Committee Act 1932 was passed which set up concept of embarkation points for Hajj.
 8 October – Indian Air Force established.
 15 October – J. R. D. Tata flew from Karachi to Bombay via Ahmedabad landing on a grass strip at Juhu paving the way for civil aviation in India.
 Poona Pact between Gandhi and Ambedkar

Law
Indian Partnership Act
Criminal Law Amendment Act
Tea District Emigrant Labour Act

Births
1 January – Shamsul Islam, Bangladeshi politician (died 2018)
6 January – Kamleshwar, writer, screenwriter, critic and essayist (died 2007).
7 January – Obaid Siddiqui, neurogeneticist. (died 2013)
13 February – V. Balakrishnan, writer and translator (died 2004).
13 February – Leela Devi, writer, translator, and teacher (died 1998).
18 May – D. Pandian, politician (died 2021)
1 June – Ashis Roy, marathon runner
7 June – M. S. Narasimhan, mathematician (died 2021)
12 June – Padmini, actress and dancer (died 2006).
12 June – E. Sreedharan, IES
22 June 
 Sharad Moreshwar Hardikar, orthopedic surgeon
Amrish Puri, actor (died 2005).
1 August – Meena Kumari, actress (died 1972).
20 August – Chandrakant Bakshi, author (died 2006).
20 September – Hamid Dalwai, social reformer and writer (died 1977).
27 September – Yash Chopra, director and producer (died 2012).
29 September – Mehmood, actor, director and producer (died 2004).
13 October – Anup Kumar, actor (died 1997).
5 December – Nadira, actress (died 2006).
21 December – U. R. Ananthamurthy, writer and critic. (died 2014)
25 December – Raees Mohammad, cricketer (died 2022 in Pakistan)

References

 
India
Years of the 20th century in India